Ryan Steven Rydel (born 9 February 2001) is an English professional footballer who plays as a left back or midfielder for  club Stockport County.

Career
Rydel began his career with Fleetwood Town, turning professional in October 2018 at the age of 17. In March 2019, following his first first-team start, Rydel was praised by manager Joey Barton.

In February 2020, he joined Lancaster City on loan for the remainder of the season.

He signed for Stockport County on 22 April 2021.

Career statistics

Honours
Stockport County
National League: 2021–22

References

2001 births
Living people
English footballers
Association football defenders
Association football midfielders
Fleetwood Town F.C. players
Lancaster City F.C. players
Stockport County F.C. players
English Football League players
National League (English football) players
Northern Premier League players